Acer pensylvanicum, known as the striped maple, moosewood, moose maple or goosefoot maple, is a small North American species of maple. The striped maple is a sequential hermaphrodite, meaning that it can change its sex throughout its lifetime.

Description
The shape of the tree is broadly columnar, with a short, forked trunk that divides into arching branches which create an uneven, flat-topped crown.

The young bark is striped with green and white, and when a little older, brown.

The bloom period for Acer pensylvanicum is around late spring.

The spelling pensylvanicum is the one originally used by Linnaeus.

Small, finger-diameter sections of branches can be used to make whistles due to the ability to lightly bruise the bark, slip it off the wood, carve the whistle hollow and airflow channel into the wood, and slip the tube of bark back on.

Distribution
The natural range of the striped maple extends from Nova Scotia and the Gaspe Peninsula of Quebec, west to southern Ontario, Michigan, and Saskatchewan; south to northeastern Ohio, Pennsylvania, and New Jersey, and along the Appalachian Mountains as far south as northern Georgia.

Ecology

Moosewood is an understory tree of cool, moist forests, often preferring slopes. It is among the most shade-tolerant of deciduous trees, capable of germinating and persisting for years as a small understory shrub, then growing rapidly to its full height when a gap opens up. However, it does not grow high enough to become a canopy tree, and once the gap above it closes through succession, it responds by flowering and fruiting profusely, and to some degree spreading by vegetative reproduction.

Mammals such as moose, deer, beavers, and rabbits eat the bark, particularly during the winter.

References

External links
 
 
 Interactive Distribution Map of Acer pensylvanicum
 NRCS: United States Department of Agriculture Plants Profile and map: Acer pennsylvanicum

pensylvanicum
Hardwood forest plants
Trees of the Northeastern United States
Flora of the Appalachian Mountains
Flora of Eastern Canada
Plants described in 1753
Taxa named by Carl Linnaeus